The Fairplay Hotel, a hotel at 500 Main St. in Fairplay, Colorado, was built in 1922.  It was listed on the National Register of Historic Places in 2008.

Fairplay was a mining town;  it is located in South Park and is the county seat of Park County.

It is designed in Rustic architecture style by prolific Denver architect William N. Bowman. The styling includes faux thatched roofing.

In 2004, a couple was trying to revive the hotel.

References

Hotels in Colorado
Buildings and structures completed in 1922
National Register of Historic Places in Park County, Colorado